The Patio Hotels Group was a British hotel chain established in 1983 with hotels in Europe and Israel.

The first three hotels were built in France in the 1980s followed by the Patio Eilat Resort Hotel in Israel. Two hotels were later opened in Scotland – one in Clydebank (completed in 1990) and another in Aberdeen (completed in 1996).

The last hotel left in the chain, the Aberdeen hotel, was revamped in September 2008 and now operates under the Doubletree brand, which is part of the Hilton family.

Platinum Club
A rewards scheme, originally called the Premier Club, was launched in 1998. The scheme was later rebranded to the Platinum Club. Members benefit from exclusive bar and dining facilities within the Platinum Club Lounge.

References

Hotels established in 1983
Defunct hotel chains
Privately held companies of the United Kingdom